Thomas D. McLaughlin (born in Oil City, Pennsylvania, on August 4, 1882) was an American architect in Lima, Ohio. His work included the design for Notre Dame College's Administration Building that was built in 1927 in a Tudor Revival architectural style, along with other styles.

McLaughlin studied at Lima College in Lima, Ohio, spent three years at Hamilton College in New York and another three years studying architecture at Columbia University. He worked as  superintendent of construction for the Buckeye Pipe Line
Company before becoming part of Dawson & McLaughlin with Charles Wilmott Dawson who came to Lima in 1900.

Dawson was born in Plainfield, New York, on December 10, 1867. He studied at Haverford College and graduated from Massachusetts Institute of Technology in 1888, and interned with Henry Van Brunt. His works included the manufacturing plant of The Deisel-Wemmer Company, the wholesale warehouse of The Moore Brothers Company, the Central Building and the Renze Block, as well as many residences such as those for J. D. S. Neely, F. T. Cuthbert, Henry G. Wemmer, W. J. Wemmer, W. K. Boone and G. E. Bluem. McLaughlin joined him in 1906.

Notre Dame's college building was built by the contractor John T. Gill and originally housed the entire college. It was added to the National Register of Historic Places as Notre Dame College of Ohio. McLaughlin submitted a design proposal for a tower at the Ohio State Capitol.

After Dawson died, McLaughlin partnered with Peter M. Hulsken to form McLaughlin and Hulsken. Their work was featured in Ohio Architect and Builder volume 18. Hulsken was a native of the Netherlands where he practiced for several years, and studied in Berlin and Paris, before coming to Lima and entering into the partnership in 1909.

McLaughlin's work and work credited to his firm with Charles Wilmott Dawson 
 Lima Memorial Hall at West Elm and South Elizabeth Streets in Lima, Ohio. Credited to "Dawson & McLaughlin" and listed on the NRHP.
 Lima Stadium at 100 South Calument Avenue and East Market Street in Lima, Ohio. Credited to  McLaughlin, Thomas D. & Assoc. and listed on the NRHP.
 Savings Building, Lima, Ohio
 The Ohio Theater
 Lima South High School (1917), built for $247,000 and expanded in 1923.

McLaughlin & Hulsken
 Lima Club, Lima Ohio 
 Allen County Memorial Building in Lima Ohio 
 Elks B.P.O.E. Lodge at 138 West North Street in Lima, Ohio credited to Hulsken & McLaughlin and listed on the NRHP.
 District Tuberculosis Hospital for the Counties of Allen, Auglaize, Mercer, Shelby and Van Wert
 Presbyterian Church, Middlepoint, Ohio
 Baptist Church, Lima, Ohio
 Lima Mattress Company building
 Central Union Telegraph building in Lima, Ohio
 Jefferson High School (Delphos, Ohio)
 E. W. Jackson building in Lima, Ohio
 St. James Apartments for L.J. Miller in Lima, Ohio
 The Marquette residence for E.B. Mitchell in Lima, Ohio
 Ed Fockler residence in Lima, Ohio
 Shawnee School
 R.L. Bates residence in Lima, Ohio
 Carnegie Library Delphos, Ohio
 Carnegie Library, Lima, Ohio
 Lincoln School Delphos, Ohio
 Clarence Leilich residence in Delphos, Ohio
 Deisel Wemmer Cigar Factory building in Delphos, Ohio
 C. B. Hunt residence in Delphos, Ohio
 Carter & Carroll building in Lima, Ohio
 Gramm Motor Car Factory in Lima, Ohio
 Design for Delphos Bank building 
 H.G. Wemmer residence in Lima, Ohio
 Samuel A. Baxter mausoleum in Lima Ohio
 Lima Locomotive Works garage in Lima, Ohio

References

1882 births
Haverford College alumni
Massachusetts Institute of Technology alumni
Architects from Ohio
20th-century American architects
Year of death missing